Walter Ernest Brown,  (3 July 1885 – 28 February 1942) was an Australian recipient of the Victoria Cross, the highest award for gallantry in the face of the enemy that can be awarded to members of the British and Commonwealth forces. He was born in Tasmania and worked as a grocer before enlisting in the Australian Army in 1915, following the outbreak of First World War. Initially he was sent to Egypt where he served in the Australian Service Corps before being transferred to the Western Front where he served in the infantry with the 20th Battalion. In July 1918, during the fighting at Villers-Bretonneux he single-handedly destroyed a German machine-gun post, taking a number of prisoners in the process. For this act he was awarded the Victoria Cross. He was also later awarded the Distinguished Conduct Medal for a previous act of bravery.

Following the war, Brown was repatriated to Australia and returned to civilian life. When the Second World War began, he lied about his age and previous experience in order to re-enlist in the Australian Army, this time serving in the Royal Australian Artillery. In 1942 Brown's unit was sent to Singapore following the Japanese attack on Malaya. He is believed to have been killed in action on 28 February 1942, although his body has never been recovered.

Early life
Walter Ernest Brown was born on 3 July 1885 in New Norfolk, Tasmania. His parents were Sidney Francis Brown—a miller—and Agnes Mary Brown (née Carney). After finishing his schooling, he worked as a grocer in Hobart until 1911, when he moved to Petersham, New South Wales, where he remained in the same line of work until the First World War broke out.

First World War
Brown enlisted in the Australian Imperial Force in July 1915 and was initially assigned to the 1st Australian Light Horse Regiment, before being transferred to the Imperial Camel Corps in Egypt. After being transferred to France he was assigned to the 55th Battalion, Australian Infantry; 1st and 2nd Field Butcheries, Australian Service Corps; and then, finally, the 20th Battalion, 5th Brigade, 2nd Division.

He managed to secure his transfer to the infantry by claiming that he had lost his false teeth, which meant that he had to be removed from the theatre and returned to Egypt, where he was able to attach himself to the infantry reinforcements that were being concentrated there prior to being sent to France to join the 20th Battalion.

His transfer to the 20th Battalion took place in July 1917 and he joined them while they were stationed in the line around St Omer. During September and October 1917, Brown took part in the fighting around Passchendaele and it was for his actions during this time that he was later awarded the Distinguished Conduct Medal. On 19 October he was promoted to lance corporal. In November he was wounded, however, he returned to his unit shortly after and on 7 April 1918 he was promoted to the rank of corporal.

On 6 July 1918 at Villers-Bretonneux, France he performed the deed for which he was awarded the Victoria Cross: Brown had rushed a machine-gun post armed with a hand grenade, taking one officer and 11 men prisoner under heavy machine-gun fire. After this incident Brown remained at the front until the end of the war, and despite being wounded again in August he was promoted to sergeant on 13 September 1918.

Following the war he was repatriated to Australia in late 1919 before being discharged on medical grounds in February 1920.

Victoria Cross citation
The award of the Victoria Cross to Brown was published in a supplement to the London Gazette on 17 August 1918, reading:

Inter war years
After being discharged from the AIF in early 1920, Brown went to live in Sydney. During this time he undertook a number of different lines of work, being employed as a brass-finisher up until 1930 when he moved to Leeton and taking up a position as a water-bailiff in the New South Wales Water Conservation and Irrigation Commission. He remained in this job until he rejoined the Army in 1940.

On 4 June 1932 Brown married Maude Dillon at Christ Church in Bexley. The couple had two children, a boy and a girl.

Second World War
Following the outbreak of the Second World War, Brown enlisted as a gunner under his real name in the 2/15th Field Regiment, Royal Australian Artillery in June 1940. Hoping to avoid attention and wanting to secure a posting to the front lines, he declared that he had "no previous military experience" and also claimed he had been born in 1900 in order to meet the age requirements for front line service. Although his identity became public knowledge, the military authorities allowed him to continue serving. He was briefly promoted to lance-sergeant, but requested to revert to the rank of gunner. His unit was sent to Malaya in August 1941 where they were attached to the 27th Brigade,  and then to Singapore in February 1942 when it was invaded.

On 15 February 1942, Brown's regiment moved up to the front line to make a final stand. Sources disagree as to what happened to Brown after this. When the order to surrender came, some witnesses alleged him to have calmly picked up some grenades and said: "No surrender for me", before walking towards the enemy lines, never to be seen again.

Author John Moremon, however, believes that Brown sought to escape and after gaining permission from his commanding officer, led a group of 2/15th men to Rengat, in Sumatra, in a rowing boat. From there it is believed that Brown and the others attempted to link up with other troops that were being evacuated via bus, but they became separated and although some managed to get away to Padang, Brown is believed to have been killed while waiting for transport.

Although his date of death is uncertain, it has been presumed that Brown was killed some time after he went missing, and the Commonwealth War Graves Commission officially records his date of death as 28 February 1942. As his body was never found, Brown has no known grave, although he is commemorated at the Singapore Memorial at Kranji War Cemetery in Singapore.

Medals
His Victoria Cross is displayed at the Australian War Memorial in Canberra.

See also
List of people who disappeared

Notes

1885 births
1942 deaths
Military personnel from Tasmania
Australian Army personnel of World War II
Australian Army soldiers
Australian military personnel killed in World War II
Australian World War I recipients of the Victoria Cross
Australian recipients of the Distinguished Conduct Medal
Australian military personnel of World War I
Missing in action of World War II